The  is a regional bank in Japan, primarily in the Yamaguchi Prefecture. It has 156 branches and offices in Japan and four overseas offices.

The bank's history dates back to 1878 when its predecessor, the Hyakuju (110th) National Bank was founded.

See also

List of banks
List of banks in Japan

External links
  

Regional banks of Japan
Yamaguchi Prefecture